John Patrick Rourke FMLS (born 26 March 1942, in Cape Town) is a South African botanist, who worked at the Kirstenbosch National Botanical Garden and became curator of the Compton Herbarium. He is a specialist in the flora of the Cape Floristic Region, in particular the family Proteaceae.

Career 
Rourke studied at the University of Cape Town from 1960 to 1970, where he obtained his B.Sc., M.Sc. and Ph.D. He started working at Kirstenbosch from 1966, and succeeded Winsome Fanny Barker as curator of the Compton Herbarium in 1972. He published several revisions of Proteacean genera including Leucadendron, Leucospermum, Mimetes, Vexatorella, Sorocephalus and Spatalla.

During his career he collected approximately 2000 specimens of flora from the southwestern and southern Cape, Namaqualand and eastern Transvaal.

In 1997 he was made foreign member of the Linnean Society of London. In 2003 Rourke was awarded the "Gold medal for Lifetime Preservation of the Environment" by The Cape Tercentenary Foundation.

Eponyms 
Several plant species were named in his honour including:
Cleretum rourkei
Grubbia rourkei
Watsonia rourkei
Leucadendron rourkei
Galium rourkei
Acmadenia rourkeana
Diosma rourkei
Thesmophora scopulosa Rourke

Selected publications 
1997 Rourke, J.P. Wild Flowers of South Africa, Struik Publishers, 
1982 Rourke, J.P.; Anderson, F.; Ripley, L. The Proteas of Southern Africa, Centaur Press, 
1972. Taxonomic Studies on Leucospermum R.Br.: J. of South African Botany 8: Additional Vol. 194 pp.
1969. Taxonomic Studies on Sorocephalus R.Br.: J. of South African Botany 7: Additional Vol. 124 pp.

References

External links 
John Patrick Rourke on JSTOR
John Patrick Rourke on Semantic Scholar

1942 births
Living people
20th-century South African botanists
21st-century South African botanists
South African curators